Biopunk (a portmanteau of "biotechnology" or "biology" and "punk") is a subgenre of science fiction that focuses on biotechnology. It is derived from cyberpunk, but focuses on the implications of biotechnology rather than mechanical cyberware and information technology. Biopunk is concerned with synthetic biology. It is derived of cyberpunk involving bio-hackers, biotech megacorporations, and oppressive government agencies that manipulate human DNA. Most often keeping with the dark atmosphere of cyberpunk, biopunk generally examines the dark side of genetic engineering and represents the low side of biotechnology.

Description

Biopunk is a subgenre of science fiction closely related to cyberpunk that focuses on the near-future (most often unintended) consequences of the biotechnology revolution following the invention of recombinant DNA. Biopunk stories explore the struggles of individuals or groups, often the product of human experimentation, against a typically dystopian backdrop of totalitarian governments and megacorporations which misuse biotechnologies as means of social control and profiteering. Unlike cyberpunk, it builds not on information technology, but on synthetic biology. Like in postcyberpunk fiction, individuals are usually modified and enhanced not with cyberware, but by genetic manipulation. A common feature of biopunk fiction is the "black clinic", which is a laboratory, clinic, or hospital that performs illegal, unregulated, or ethically-dubious biological modification and genetic engineering procedures. Many features of biopunk fiction have their roots in William Gibson's Neuromancer, one of the first cyberpunk novels.

One of the prominent writers in this field is Paul Di Filippo, though he called his collection of such stories ribofunk, a blend of "ribosome" and "funk". In RIBOFUNK: The Manifesto, Di Filippo wrote:

Di Filippo suggests that precursors of biopunk fiction include H. G. Wells' The Island of Doctor Moreau; Julian Huxley's The Tissue-Culture King; some of David H. Keller's stories, Damon Knight's Natural State and Other Stories; Frederik Pohl and Cyril M. Kornbluth's Gravy Planet; novels of T. J. Bass and John Varley; Greg Bear's Blood Music and Bruce Sterling's Schismatrix. The stories of Cordwainer Smith, including his first and most famous Scanners Live in Vain, also foreshadow biopunk themes. In Brazil, the biopunk movement was popularized in 2020 with the book O Último Ruivo, written by Clayton De La Vie, which portrays a reality where society has greatly improved medically and is able to eradicate nearly all diseases in the world, at the cost of widespread ethnic cleansing and genocide. The chaotic scenario is replaced by an oppressive and fear-laden environment on the part of a coerced population.

See also

 List of biopunk works
 Cyberpunk
 Cyberpunk derivatives
 Nanopunk
 Dieselpunk
 Steampunk
 Solarpunk
 Seapunk
 Genetic engineering in fiction
 Grinder (biohacking)
 Human enhancement
 Transhumanism

References

External links

 Hackteria.org, a community for bio-artists

 
Biology and culture
Biocybernetics
Bioinformatics
Molecular genetics
Postmodernism
Science fiction genres
Synthetic biology
Systems biology
Subcultures
Transhumanism
1990s neologisms